Roadkill is an animal or animals struck and killed by motor vehicles on highways.

Roadkill or Road Kill may also refer to:

Film and television

Film 
 Roadkill (1989 film), a Canadian comedy
 Road Kill (1999 film), an American action comedy film
 Roadkill (2001 film) or Joy Ride, an American thriller road film
 Road Kill (2005 film), a short film co-produced by Vickie Gest
 Road Kill (2010 film) or Road Train, an Australian horror road film
 Roadkill (2011 film), an American TV science fiction horror film

Television 
 Roadkill (TV series), a 2020 British political drama series
 Roadkill (web series), an automotive-themed internet show

Episodes 
 "Road Kill" (The Challenge: Fresh Meat II)
 "Roadkill" (Criminal Minds)
 "Road Kill" (Crossing Jordan)
 "Road Kill" (Dexter)
 "Road Kill" (In the Heat of the Night)
 "Roadkill" (Murder, She Wrote)
 "Road Kill" (NCIS)
 "Roadkill" (Supernatural)

Music

Albums
 Road Kill (Groove Terminator album) (2000)
 Road Kill (The Haunted album) (2009)
 Roadkill (Kill the Drive album) (2006)
 Roadkill (Manilla Road album) (1988)
 Road Kill (Seven Nations album) (1998)
 Road Kill (video), a 1993 collection of live performances by Skid Row

Songs
 "Roadkill", a song by the Dickies from Idjit Savant (1990)
 "Roadkill", a song by Engerica (2005)
 "Roadkill", a song by Suede from The Blue Hour (2018)
 "Roadkill", a song by the 1975 from Notes on a Conditional Form (2020)

Other uses 
 RoadKill (video game), a 2003 car combat video game
 Roadkill (wrestler) or Michael Depoli, American professional wrestler
 Roadkill cuisine